Percy Colque Paredes (born October 23, 1976) is a Bolivian former footballer who played as a defender.

Club career
Colque played for local clubs The Strongest, Deportivo Municipal, Chaco Petrolero, San José and Bolívar as well as for Mexican side UANL Tigres and Albanian club KF Tirana.

In 2014, at the age of 38, he played for FC Meyrin of the Swiss 1. Liga.

International career
He played for the Bolivia national team between 2002 and 2005, scoring 2 goals in 20 games. He represented them at the 2001 Copa América.

References

External links
 
 Profile at BoliviaGol.com 
 
 
 

1976 births
Living people
Sportspeople from La Paz
Association football defenders
Bolivian footballers
Bolivia international footballers
2001 Copa América players
The Strongest players
Club San José players
Tigres UANL footballers
Club Bolívar players
KF Tirana players
Club Real Potosí players
FC Meyrin players
Bolivian expatriate footballers
Expatriate footballers in Mexico
Bolivian expatriate sportspeople in Mexico
Expatriate footballers in Albania
Bolivian expatriate sportspeople in Albania
Expatriate footballers in Switzerland
Bolivian expatriate sportspeople in Switzerland
Liga MX players
Kategoria Superiore players